The Agricultural History Review. A Journal of Agricultural and Rural History is a peer-reviewed academic journal published quarterly by the British Agricultural History Society. It was established in 1953.

See also 
 Agriculture in the United Kingdom#History
 The Economic History Review 
 Economic history of the United Kingdom
 British Agricultural Revolution
 Historiography of the United Kingdom
 History of Agriculture

References

External links
Agricultural History Review homepage
Agricultural History Review at WorldCat

History journals
English-language journals
Publications established in 1953
Quarterly journals